Maxime Alexandre (February 4, 1971 in Ronse, East Flanders, Belgium) is a Belgian Italian cinematographer, who was most recently cinematographer on the Netflix and Amblin Entertainment series The Haunting of Bly Manor, the films Come Play directed by Jacob Chase, Shazam! directed by David F. Sandberg, and Crawl, directed by Alexandre Aja.

Early life
Born in Ronse, Belgium in 1971, Alexandre moved with his family to Rome when he was five. His stepfather, Inigo Lezzi (at the time assistant director for Marco Bellocchio, Gianni Amelio, and Nanni Moretti), guided him through discovering the Italian cinema greats. He was soon working as a young actor in several movies, including UNE PAGE D’AMOUR, directed by Elie Chouraqui, with Anouk Aimee and Bruno Cremer, and Nanni Moretti BIANCA in 1984.

A few years later, he discovered a passion for photography on the set of a short movie directed by his stepfather. In the late 1980s his family moved to Paris where he began his career in the camera department working on commercials, learning from great cinematographers like Darius Khondji, Jean-Yves Escoffier, Pierre Lhomme, Vilko Filac, and Italian cinematographers including Tonino Delli Colli and Franco Di Giacomo. 
His earliest work as a director of photography was shooting second unit on a commercial for Michel Gondry.

Career
Then in 2001, he met Alexandre Aja and Grégory Levasseur when he shot second unit for Aja’s father, Alexandre Arcady, on BREAK OF DAWN written by Aja and Levasseur. Two years later, the three of them collaborated on Aja’s directorial debut, High Tension Haute Tension. The movie was internationally recognised as the beginning of the new wave of horror in French cinema and was picked up for distribution by Lionsgate. He collaborated again with Aja on the remake of The Hills Have Eyes (2006 film) and Mirrors (film), during which he met Wes Craven, with whom he worked on Paris, je t'aime.  The film screened in Un Certain Regard at the Cannes Film Festival. Marock, a movie directed by Laila Marrakchi in 2005, also went to Cannes.

In 2006, he was recognised by Variety as one of its Ten Cinematographers to Watch. Several other films have followed, including P2, directed by Franck Khalfoun, and THE CRAZIES, by Breck Eisner. In 2008, he directed his first feature film, HOLY MONEY, starring Aaron Stanford, Ben Gazzara, Valeria Solarino and Joaquim De Almeida. His second film as director, CHRISTOPHER ROTH, was selected for several festivals, including the Brussels International Fantastic Film Festival; the Rome Independent Film Festival; Brazil’s Cinefantasy, where it won Best Movie, Best Villain, Best Make Up, Best SFX, and Best Soundtrack; and won the Best Director at the Italian 2nd Fantasy Horror Awards.
Director Michael J. Bassett’s 2011 film SILENT HILL REVELATION was his first feature as a 3D cinematographer.
 
In 2012, he worked on Maniac, directed by Franck Khaifoun and starring Elijah Wood, which premiered at the 2012 Cannes Film Festival. He shot Dave Green’s film EARTH TO ECHO in 2014. That year he also shot The Voices, starring Ryan Reynolds and Anna Kendrick. The film, directed by Marjane Satrapi, premiered at the 2014 Sundance Film Festival.

Filmography

References

External links

Official Website

1971 births
Italian cinematographers
People from Ronse
Living people